This is a list of villages in Jalore district, Rajasthan state, western India.

According to the statistics of the census of 2011, there are 9 sub-districts, 11 towns, 8 statutory towns, 3 census town and total 1111 villages in the district.

Villages 

 Rewatra
 Ahore
  Bhavrani
 Badgaon
 Bagora
 Bhanwarani
 Bhundwa (Bhandavpur)
 Bhinmal
 Chitalwana
 Dawal
 Dedwa
 Dhamana
 Jakhal
 Jalor
 Karda
 Khara
 Malwara
 Mithi Beri
 Raniwara
 Sanchore
 Sankad
 Sayla
 Siwara
 Ajodar
 Odwada
 Veriya
 Dudhwa
 Dhansa
 Modran
ummedabad

See also 

 Jalore District
 List of villages in India

Sangarwa

References